Marion Hutton (born Marion Thornburg; March 10, 1919 – January 10, 1987) was an American singer and actress. She is best remembered for her singing with the Glenn Miller Orchestra from 1938 to 1942. She was the sister of actress and singer Betty Hutton.

Early life
Born as Marion Thornburg in Fort Smith, Arkansas, she was the elder sister of actress Betty Hutton. They were raised in Battle Creek, Michigan. The sisters' father abandoned the family when they were both young; he later committed suicide. Their mother worked a variety of jobs to support the family until she became a successful bootlegger. Both sisters sang with the Vincent Lopez Orchestra.

Discovery by Glenn Miller
Hutton was discovered by Glenn Miller and was invited to join the Glenn Miller Orchestra in 1938.  "I was only seventeen then [...] and so Glenn and Helen [Miller] became my legal guardians. He was like a father because I never had a father I remembered." Miller wanted Hutton to appear as an all-American girl, so on her first few performances, he introduced her as "Sissy Jones." The pseudonym was not used beyond those first performances.

Hutton was not allowed to sing in the nightclubs due to the fact she was underage. Miller and his wife Helen signed papers to officially declare themselves foster parents to serve as Hutton's chaperone in the nightclubs which allowed her access in these venues. Marion Hutton considered herself more an entertainer than a singer. Hutton remained an important part of the Miller band. She remained with Miller on and off, until the orchestra disbanded in 1942.

Film career

Jeanine Basinger, a film historian and professor at Wesleyan University in Middletown, Connecticut, refers to Hutton in her chapter on Marion's younger sister, actress and singer Betty Hutton in the 2007 book The Star Machine. Basinger asserts that in the early forties, Marion was more popular than her sister Betty. Marion Hutton had a small role in the film Orchestra Wives (1942; Twentieth Century Fox), in which the Glenn Miller Orchestra starred. After Miller joined the Army in 1942, she went with fellow Miller performers Tex Beneke and the Modernaires on a theater tour.

The next important event in her entertainment career was a role in In Society with Abbott and Costello in 1944.  Marion Hutton appeared with the Desi Arnaz orchestra in October 1947 at the Radio City Theatre in Minneapolis. As the 1940s wound down, so did Marion's career. Her last film role was in 1949, acting in the Marx Brothers' Love Happy.

Personal life
Hutton was married three times. She married publicist and television producer Jack Philbin in 1940. They had two sons, John and Phillip. Her next marriage, to writer Jack Douglas, produced a third son, Peter. Peter Hemming is a noted photojournalist. Her last and longest marriage was in 1954 to Vic Schoen, an arranger for the Andrews Sisters and Bing Crosby, among other artists in the 1940s. The couple remained married until her death in 1987. Looking back on her first marriage, in 1974 she told George T. Simon, "[W]hat I wanted most of all was to be a wife and mother. I had no drive for a career."

In 1965 according to the New York Times, Hutton sought treatment for various addictions. Hutton went back to school in her late fifties. She received two psychology degrees and found work at a local hospital. During the 1960s and 1970s, Hutton and Schoen lived in Laguna Beach but later moved due to increasing financial problems. In 1981, Hutton and Schoen moved from Irvine, California, to Kirkland, Washington, and founded Residence XII, a drug addiction center to help alcoholics and addicts. She was the executive director.

Schoen and Hutton performed many fundraisers for this addiction center. They had both struggled with alcoholism and in the 1970s both were finally able to quit drinking and joined AA. They attended meetings regularly until the late 1980s and helped many struggling alcoholics by recounting their anecdotes and life lessons they had learned throughout the years. Schoen arranged music for  Glenn Miller Remembered,  a 1984 PBS production videotaped in Seattle, Washington, starring Tex Beneke and Hutton. Later that year, Schoen also arranged music for the PBS production "Glenn Miller- A Moonlight Serenade" commemorating the 40th anniversary of Miller's death at the historic Glen Island Casino, starring Beneke, Johnny Desmond, and Hutton.

Death
Marion Hutton died of cancer on January 10, 1987, at age 67, in Kirkland, Washington.

Selected discography
1939 "Ding Dong the Witch is Dead", with Glenn Miller and his Orchestra, Bluebird (recorded July 12, 1939)
1942 "That's Sabotage" with Glenn Miller and his Orchestra, Victor (recorded June 17, 1942)
1940 "The Rhumba Jumps" vocal with Tex Beneke, with Glenn Miller and his Orchestra, Bluebird (recorded January 26, 1940)
1940 "Say 'Si Si'" with Glenn Miller and his Orchestra, Bluebird 10622 (recorded January 26, 1940)
1942."(I've Got a Gal in) Kalamazoo" vocal with Tex Beneke and the Modernaires, with Glenn Miller and his Orchestra, Victor 27934-A (recorded May 20, 1942)

References

External links

1919 births
1987 deaths
Actresses from Michigan
American film actresses
Deaths from cancer in Washington (state)
Big band singers
People from Battle Creek, Michigan
Musicians from Kirkland, Washington
20th-century American actresses
20th-century American singers
20th-century American women singers
Glenn Miller Orchestra members